I Am What I Am is the sixty-second studio album by American country music artist Merle Haggard. It was released on April 20, 2010 by Vanguard Records. The album peaked at number 18 on the Billboard Top Country Albums chart.

The final song, “It's Gonna Be Me,” was only released on Amazon.com, despite having received positive review as a song which stands out with a heavy bass line and social-critical lyrics.

Track listing
All songs written by Merle Haggard except where noted.
"I've Seen It Go Away" – 3:00
"Pretty When It's New" – 3:12
"Oil Tanker Train" – 3:02
"Live and Love Always" – 2:30
"The Road to My Heart" (Freddy Powers) – 2:50
"How Did You Find Me Here" (M. Haggard, Theresa Lane Haggard) – 3:55
"We're Falling in Love Again" – 3:31
"Bad Actor" (Doug Colosio, M. Haggard, Scott Joss) – 3:28
"Down at the End of the Road" – 3:10
"Stranger in the City" – 2:09
"Mexican Bands" – 3:27
"I Am What I Am" – 2:38
"It's Gonna Be Me" - 3:27 (Amazon Exclusive)

Personnel
Merle Haggard - fiddle, guitar, lead vocals, background vocals
Norm Hamlet - steel guitar
Biff Adam - bass guitar, drums
Don Markham - trumpet
Gary Church - trombone
Red Lane - guitar
Doug Colosio - piano
Ben Haggard - drums, guitar, soloist, background vocals
Theresa Lane Haggard - lead and background vocals
Tim Howard - guitar, soloist
Rob Ickes - Dobro
Scott Joss - fiddle, guitar, background vocals
George Receli - drums, percussion, background vocals
Reggie Young - guitar

Chart performance

References

2010 albums
Merle Haggard albums
Vanguard Records albums